Maleri Formation may refer to:
 Upper Maleri Formation, Late Triassic formation in India
 Lower Maleri Formation, Late Triassic formation in India